is a media franchise created by Bushiroad with five other companies: Bandai Visual, Doga Kobo, Nitroplus, Lantis, and Yuhodo. It consists of a trading card game, with the first products released on February 28, 2016, and an anime television series by Doga Kobo.

Plot

Luck & Logic
In the year L.C. 922, mankind faces an unprecedented crisis. Following the conclusion of a hundred-year war on the mythical world of Tetra-Heaven, the losing demon gods sought a safe haven and invaded the human world Septpia. The government forced to fight by employing logicalists belonging to the Another Logic Counter Agency (ALCA), a special police that protects the streets from foreigners of another world. Logicalists are given a special power that allows them to enter a trance with goddesses from the other world. One day, Yoshichika Tsurugi, a civilian who is lacking "Logic" and lives peacefully with his family, meets the beautiful goddess Athena while helping people escape from a demon god attack. She wields the "Logic" that Yoshichika should have lost. This leads Yoshichika to an unexpected destiny with Athena. To the young logicalists whose natures are of "luck" and "logic", the future of the world has been entrusted.

Hina Logi ~from Luck & Logic~
It has been a year since the demon gods attacked the city of Naien and the world is at peace once again. Liones Yelistratova, a princess from a small country, begins her study at a school which is a special facility run by ALCA who trains logicalists to protect the peace of the world. Liones has a lot of unique classmates in Class 1-S. They include Nina Alexandrovna, a mature but loner student who takes pride as a logicalist; Mahiro Kyobashi, a student with talents for technology and likes searching for foreigners; and Yayoi Tachibana, the elegant class representative.

Luck & Logic characters

Logicalists

The main protagonist of the seies. Missing "logic" from a past tragedy, but despite this, he is living happily with his family. Becomes the covenanter of the Tetra-Heaven Foreigner "Goddess Who Rules over Wisdom and Strategy, Athena."

Holds a leadership position among the Logicalists. Takes a tough attitude towards Yoshichika. Can both study and exercise, and is a serious class president type. Covenanter of "Goddess of Love and Beauty, Venus."

A blonde girl, whose charm point is her ribbon and ponytail. Has a sporty and bright personality, and is friendly to anyone. Covenanter of "Goddess of War, Valkyrie."

Reticent with sharp eyes, and does not have much of a relationship with others. She is always found listening to music on her headphones, and is often alone. Covenanter of "Goddess of the Moon, Artemis."

Chief of the Naien branch of ALCA. She serves as a mentor of logicalists, but also enters the battlefield herself. In the wake of a certain incident, she developed feelings of revenge against the foreigners from the parallel worlds. Covenanter of "Goddess of Wrath and Punishment, Nemesis."

She was the manager of the women's high school soccer team, but was forcibly called to become a rookie Logicalist. She assumes the role of a supporting member and a caring person, but often does clumsy things. Later becomes the covenanter of "Snake God, Quetzalcoatl."

A logicalist belonging to ALCA. He was analyzed to have extraordinary potential as a logicalist, however. Later becomes the covenanter of "Ruler of Sept-Heaven, Lucifer."

Foreigners

A goddess of the parallel world Tetra-Heaven. She meets Yoshichika and is sent into a lifestyle of cohabitation. A kind-hearted woman who hates it when precious life is lost. Is filled with a sense of justice.

A goddess who came from Tetra-Heaven together with Athena. Embraces all love in everything, and is characterized by falling in love immediately. At every opportunity, she speaks words of love to men and women alike.

A goddess of Tetra-Heaven, and the less talkative one between her and Chloe, her personality is the kind that does not understand jokes. Although she acknowledges Chloe's bravery in battle, she feels grief that she is at her mercy every day.

A mysterious goddess who came from Tetra-Heaven. A woman who sings and loves poetry. She watches the school from a distance. She is nocturnal, and becomes sleepy if the moon is not out.

A goddess of Tetra-Heaven with a sharp tongue. Zombie movies are a great favorite of hers, as she has a weakness for grotesque things. She has an erudite side, which does not suit her young appearance. Keeps a strict eye on young logicalists.

An arrogant demon god who believes himself superior to human beings. However, he is willing to help people who he sees as giving him the proper respect a god deserves, including Yukari, who he sees as a high priestess of sorts. He eventually becomes the partner of Yukari.

A detached and somewhat aloof demon god, but affable in general conversation. He generally shows no ill will, even when talking to his enemies. His true goal is coexistence between humans and gods, a mission he honestly and strongly believes in. He eventually becomes the partner of Olga.

Other characters

Director of ALCA.

Yoshichika's younger sister.

One of the staff members in the command center of ALCA revealed to be a good hacker.

An earphone with a mic which generates a screen in front of the logicalists' eyes when activated. It has a variety of functions, including data analysis, communication, closing gates, and forming covenants. Staff members are responsible for analyzing and calculating data sent from Logigraphs.

Hina Logi ~from Luck & Logic~ characters

Logicalists

The eccentric but potentially powerful student of Pirari Academy. Introduced as a princess from a small country who always had the dream to become a logicalist. Develops a close friendship with Nina. Covenanter of "Flower Lips, Rosa" and "Innocent Running About, Waffle".

The soft-spoken student of Pirari Academy. Previously a professional logicalist from ALCA, but transferred to the academy to learn how to enjoy her youth. Develops a close friendship with Liones. Covenanter of "I'll Shoot!, Amor" and "Proud Archangel, Michael".

The tech savvy student of Pirari Academy. Has a thirst for foreigners and their culture. Usually builds and carries gizmos and gadgets. Covenanter of "Preparing for Battle, Selen" and "Main Armament Fire, Dread".

The ace student of Pirari Academy. Comes from a family of merchants that has built a conglomerate corporation. Covenanter of "Scepter Staff Technique, Qipao" and "Manipulating Airflow, Nagi".

The resident advisor at Shirakaba Dormitory and the student council vice president of Pirari Academy. Covenanter of "Goddess of the Hearth, Vesta".

Twin sister of Karen and close friend of Yayoi. Wears a blue scarf.

Twin sister of Karin and close friend of Yayoi. Wears a red scarf.

The student council president of Pirari Academy. Shown to have unrequited romantic feelings towards Yuko.

The student council treasurer of Pirari Academy. Revealed to be a transfer student from ALCA to retrain as a logicalist.

The student council secretary of Pirari Academy. Revealed to be a transfer student from ALCA to retrain as a logicalist.

Foreigners
 

Rosa is a foreigner from Monolium who can control vines with her flowers. Vesta is a foreigner from Tetra-Heaven who can instantaneously complete household chores.

A foreigner from Tetra-Heaven, armed with a bow and arrow with the ability to pierce objects and wings for flight.

 

Qipao is a foreigner from Disfia, armed with a scepter staff used for close combat. Dread is a foreigner from Tritomy, armed with an artillery mecha-type weapon used for far range.

A foreigner from Tritomy, armed with a saber used for close combat and rocket boosters used for flight.

A foreigner from Tetra-Heaven, armed with a sword and shield.

A foreigner from Monolium, armed with dual blades.

A foreigner from Disfia who can control wind with her feathers.

Other characters

The assistant homeroom teacher of Class 1-S of Pirari Academy.

The homeroom teacher of Class 1-S of Pirari Academy.

The cloaked, harp-playing principal of Pirari Academy.

The bespectacled, hardworking vice principal of Pirari Academy.

Liones's father. Behaves like a helicopter parent around Liones despite his masculinity.

Liones's mother. Behaves very sternly around Liones despite her femininity.

Media

Anime
A 12-episode anime television series by Doga Kobo aired from January 9 to March 26, 2016.

A new 12-episode television series titled  aired from July 1 to September 23, 2017. Funimation has licensed both series in North America. Muse Communication licensed both series in Southeast Asia.

Episode list

Luck & Logic

Hina Logi ~from Luck & Logic~

Notes

Trading card game
The Luck & Logic trading card game was officially released in Japan on January 28, 2016. Trial deck 1 and 2, Brave Logic and Rinne Logic respectively, as well as the first booster expansion, Growth & Genesis, was released in English on June 24, 2016. Booster set 5, Trance Re:union, was the last set released for English edition of the game, which was released on March 31, 2017.

Gameplay
Luck & Logic is played between two players with pre-constructed decks. Players take turns playing cards, using abilities, and initiating battles. The game ends when one of two win conditions are met.

Win conditions
There are two win conditions in Luck & Logic. A player wins by destroying all six of his opponent's gates or when his opponent refreshes twice. Refreshing is the act of shuffling one's drop zone (discard pile) back into the deck.

Deck construction
These decks consist of 60 cards in total, 50 cards in the main deck and 10 cards in the gate deck. The main deck contains member, tactics, and paradox cards, and the gate deck must consist of exactly 10 gate cards. You may have up to four cards of the same name in the main deck, and up to two cards of the same Gate number in the gate deck.

Card types

Member
There are three types of members in Luck & Logic: Logicalists, Foreigners, and Tranceunions.

Logicalists and Foreigners are members that can combine through Trance to form Tranceunions. These members can be played from hand or "sortied" by paying its cost using "stock," as long as its level is equal to or less than the number of cards in the player's level zone. Tranceunions may have a Logic Drive ability that can be played in the main phase, as long as the Tranceunion has "soul" under it. Tranceunions obtain "soul" when they are played through the Trance method. If they are played from the hand without using Trance, they do not have "soul" and cannot use their Logic Drive.

Tactics
Tactics cards are "event" cards that can be played during a battle, and they give the player's member an advantage in the battle.

Paradox
Paradoxes are horizontal cards that, like Tactics cards, can be played during a battle. These paradoxes change the rules of the battle and may swing the outcome of the battle.

Gate
These are the cards that make up the gate deck. The gate cards are placed face-down on every circle. When a gate is destroyed, it is flipped face-up. Destroying all of the opponent's gates is a win condition.

References

External links
 

 

2016 anime television series debuts
2017 anime television series debuts
Bushiroad
Bandai Namco franchises
Collectible card games
Doga Kobo
Funimation
Mass media franchises
Muse Communication
LGBT in anime and manga